William Tindall may refer to:
 William York Tindall, American Joycean scholar
 William D. Tindall, Canadian politician

See also
 Bill Tindall (Howard Wilson Tindall Jr.), American aerospace engineer, NASA engineer and manager
 William Tyndale, English scholar and leading figure in the Protestant Reformation
 William T. Tyndall, U.S. Representative from Missouri